Santa Fe Historic District is a historic district in Santa Fe, New Mexico that was listed on the National Register of Historic Places in 1973. It includes two sites that are individually named U.S. National Historic Landmarks:
Santa Fe Plaza
Palace of the Governors
In addition, it includes:
Donaciano Vigil House, a separately-listed Registered Historic Place
The district boundaries were later amended, and now wholly includes the Gross, Kelly, and Company Warehouse, built in 1913, which was an early work of a creator of the Spanish Pueblo Revival style, Isaac Hamilton Rapp.

See also

National Register of Historic Places listings in Santa Fe County, New Mexico

References

External links

Contributing Buildings Sequenced By Address for Santa Fe Historic District
Bird's eye view & map of central part of Santa Fe Historic District, interactive map

  

Historic districts on the National Register of Historic Places in New Mexico
History of Santa Fe County, New Mexico
Geography of Santa Fe County, New Mexico
Northern Rio Grande National Heritage Area
Tourist attractions in Santa Fe, New Mexico
National Register of Historic Places in Santa Fe, New Mexico
1972 establishments in New Mexico